The discography of English-born, Australian rock singer-songwriter Jon English.

Albums

Studio albums

Soundtrack albums

Live albums

Compilations

Cast albums
 1972 Jesus Christ Superstar (Original Australian Cast Recording) (MCA)
 1974 Ned Kelly: A Rock Opera – Studio Cast Recording (1974)
 1984 Street Hero
 1990 Paris (WEA)
 1994 The Pirates of Penzance (EMI Records)
 2000 Buskers and Angels

Box sets
 The Great Jon English [3 CD package] (2008)
 Anthology 1973 - 1976 [4 CD package] (2012, Fanfare)
 Anthology 1977 - 1983 [4 CD package] (2012, Fanfare)
 Black Label [6 CD package] (2013, Fanfare) AUS: No. 96
 Anthology 1986-2000 [3 CD package) (2016, Fanfare)

Singles

"—" denotes releases that did not chart, or have no reliable sources of charting information.

Other singles

References

Discographies of Australian artists
Rock music discographies
Pop music discographies